Małgorzata Rohde (born 7 October 1962 in Drawsko Pomorskie) is a Polish politician and former Member of the Sejm for Koszalin (19 October 2001 to 18 October 2005). She is a member of the Conservative People's Party.

References 

1962 births
Living people
Members of the Polish Sejm 2001–2005
Women members of the Sejm of the Republic of Poland
21st-century Polish women politicians
People from Drawsko Pomorskie
Adam Mickiewicz University in Poznań alumni